Ernst Ferdinand Adolf Minding (– ) was a German-Russian mathematician known for his contributions to differential geometry. He continued the work of Carl Friedrich Gauss concerning differential geometry of surfaces, especially its intrinsic aspects. Minding considered questions of bending of surfaces and proved the invariance of geodesic curvature. He studied ruled surfaces, developable surfaces and surfaces of revolution and determined geodesics on the pseudosphere. Minding's results on the geometry of geodesic triangles on a surface of constant curvature (1840) anticipated Beltrami's approach to the foundations of non-Euclidean geometry (1868).

Career
Minding was largely self-taught in mathematics. He attended lectures in the University of Halle and eventually graduated with a thesis "De valore intergralium duplicium quam proxime inveniendo" (1829).

Minding worked as a teacher in Elberfeld and as a university lecturer in Berlin. His work on statics drew the attention of Alexander von Humboldt. However, his 1842 bid for election to Berlin Academy, supported by Peter Gustav Lejeune Dirichlet, failed and in 1843 he relocated to the University of Dorpat, where he was a professor of mathematics for the next 40 years. In Dorpat he taught Karl Peterson and supervised his doctoral thesis that established the Gauss–Bonnet theorem and derived Gauss–Codazzi equations. Minding also worked on differential equations (Demidov prize of the St Petersburg Academy in 1861), algebraic functions, continued fractions and analytical mechanics. His list of publications consists of some 60 titles, including several books. Many of his scientific accomplishments were only recognized properly after his death.

References

External links 

Differential geometers
19th-century German mathematicians
Russian mathematicians
Corresponding members of the Saint Petersburg Academy of Sciences
Honorary members of the Saint Petersburg Academy of Sciences
1806 births
1885 deaths